Sing As We Go is a 1934 British musical film starring Gracie Fields, John Loder and Stanley Holloway. The script was written by Gordon Wellesley and J. B. Priestley.

Considered by many to be British music hall star Gracie Fields' finest vehicle, this film was written for her by leading novelist J.B. Priestley. In this morale-boosting depression movie, set in the industrial north of England, Fields stars as a resourceful, determined working class heroine, laid off from her job in a clothing mill, who has to seek work in the seaside resort of Blackpool. This gives her the opportunity both to fall into many misadventures and, of course, to sing.

The decision to film on location brings the film a life and immediacy all too absent from most films of the period. The film provides us with a snapshot of life in a seaside resort in the 1930s. The final scene of the millworkers returning to the re-opened mill while Fields leads them in the rousing title song has become an almost iconic film cliché.

Main cast
 Gracie Fields as Gracie Platt 
 John Loder as Hugh Phillips 
 Dorothy Hyson as Phyllis Logan 
 Stanley Holloway as Policeman 
 Frank Pettingell as Uncle Murgatroyd Platt 
 Lawrence Grossmith as Sir William Upton 
 Morris Harvey as The Cowboy 
 Arthur Sinclair as The Great Maestro 
 Maire O'Neill as Madame Osiris  
 Ben Field as Nobby 
 Olive Sloane as Violet - The Song-Plugger's Girlfriend 
 Margaret Yarde as Mrs. Clotty 
 Evelyn Roberts as Parkinson 
 Norman Walker as Hezekiah Crabtree
 Florence Gregson as Aunt Alice

Critical reception
The Radio Times Guide to Film gave the film three stars out of five and described Sing As We Go as a "dated but spirited musical comedy...amusing and politically astute".

By contrast, in History of Modern Britain, Andrew Marr singled out Sing As We Go as an icon of British pop culture of the 1930s, concluding: "Fairy tale or not, this is probably the worst film I have ever seen."

In popular culture
The main theme of this movie, the song "Sing As We Go" (written by Harry Parr Davies), was used by the comedy group Monty Python in a parody song called "Sit on My Face" and is one of two signature songs of The Kampen Janitsjarorkester Symphonic Band (The Kampen Band) of Oslo Norway.

References

External links

1934 films
British musical comedy-drama films
British black-and-white films
1930s musical comedy-drama films
Films with screenplays by J. B. Priestley
Films directed by Basil Dean
Films set in Blackpool
Associated Talking Pictures
1934 comedy films
1934 drama films
1930s English-language films
1930s British films